Club Deportivo Roda is a Spanish football team based in Villarreal, in the autonomous community of Valencian Community. Founded in 1974, it plays in Tercera División RFEF – Group 6, holding home matches at Ciutat Esportiva Pamesa Ceràmica.

Initially dedicated exclusively to youth football, Roda established a senior team in 1999. In 2006 the club signed a collaboration agreement with Villarreal CF, sharing their youth setups and helping in the development of players.

History
José Roda, CD Roda founder, wanted his children to play sports. That is why in 1974 he decided to found his own football club, named after his family name.

Season to season

4 seasons in Tercera División
1 season in Tercera División RFEF

References

External links
Official website 
La Preferente team profile 

Football clubs in the Valencian Community
Association football clubs established in 1974
1974 establishments in Spain